The House at 68 Maple Street is an historic building located on the corner of Maple Street and Nonantum Road in the village of Newton Corner, in Newton, Massachusetts.  Built in the late 1840s, the two-story wood-frame building is a rare local example of a vernacular square hip-roofed Italianate house.  Its most prominent feature are its overscaled brackets, which decorate both the extended eaves and the roof line of the bay on the front facade.

On September 4, 1986, it was added to the National Register of Historic Places.

See also
 National Register of Historic Places listings in Newton, Massachusetts

References

Houses on the National Register of Historic Places in Newton, Massachusetts
Houses completed in 1847
Italianate architecture in Massachusetts
1847 establishments in Massachusetts